Gajendra Singh is an Indian television producer and director. His most popular shows include Close-Up Antakshari, SaReGaMa and the recent Amul Music ka Maha Muqqabla and Sur Kshetra. He grew with Zee TV and took Indian Television to an international level. He appeared in "Limca book of Records" for making the longest running musical reality show "Antakshari" on Indian Television diaspora for 10 continuous years. This was followed by 'Sa Re Ga Ma' another longest running show along with the programs like India's Best Cinestar's ki Khoj and Lil' Champs.

Professional career
He is known for pioneering and popularizing game shows, and musical talent shows on Indian Television. He had a long and successful association with Zee TV till 2006.
Due to some reasons he left Zee TV and commenced with Saaibaba Telefilms and created various projects with Star TV, Sony Entertainment Television Asia, SAB TV, Doordarshan, Sun TV Network and various other regional channels. He is from Azamgarh, Uttar Pradesh.

Saaibaba Telefilms
Saaibaba Telefilms is a multifaceted media company spearheaded by Gajendra Singh, with interest in the television reality shows & fictions, upcoming talents, events, creative endeavours, and other growing aspects of the media industry. STPL provides a confluence of cutting edge creativity, and best performance in all its work.

Antakshari

Titan Antakshari - Intercollegiate Championship is an Indian musical game show that airs on Zee TV every Friday. The show is a replacement of the Titan Antakshari -L'il Champs.

Sa Re Ga Ma Pa

The first episode aired on 1 May 1995 and was hosted by Sonu Nigam.

STAR Voice Of India

Star Voice of India is an Indian Television singing talent hunt that premiered on 18 May 2007 and ended on 24 November 2007. It was the first Indian singing competition produced by STAR Plus.
Voice of India 2 began on 18 July 2008.

Television

References

External links
 
Star Talk
Gajendra Singh bats for Reality Show
Star gives me ample scope to innovate

Indian television producers
People from Azamgarh
Living people
Year of birth missing (living people)